The New Edition Story is an American biographical three-part miniseries about the R&B group New Edition, from their rise to fame as a boy band from the Orchard Park Projects of Roxbury, Massachusetts, to becoming a successful adult act. It was originally broadcast on BET from January 24 through January 26, 2017, becoming the network's first scripted miniseries. All six members of New Edition served as co-producers.

Plot

Part One 

Opening Sequence - Home Again Tour - New Mexico, 1997

Narration by Brook Payne (Wood Harris), the group's first manager, sets the stage: all six members of New Edition are back on tour in 1997, almost twenty years after the group's formation, separations, and solo projects.  The divisions are still present as, in addition to performing the group's hits, the three solo acts - Ralph Tresvant, Johnny Gill, and Bobby Brown - and the trio Bell Biv DeVoe (or BBD,) also have their own scheduled sets.

Tensions reach a boiling point at the New Mexico concert.  As Brown - whose decade-long selfishness and severely erratic behavior resulted in his being suspended from the group a decade prior - starts yet another song well after his scheduled time is up. DeVoe goes on stage, thanking Brown for his performance. He then directs the disc jockey DJ to begin playing the BBD set.  After briefly walking off stage, an enraged Brown returns and gets into a confrontation with DeVoe, as the musical performance is replaced by a wild brawl among the various New Edition members and their entourages, punctuated by a gunshot.

Payne's narration states that, "Ego, pride, and greed resulted in this blow up of what had once been a successful group of brothers." and decides to rewind the scene nearly twenty years, back to the group's founding in Roxbury, Massachusetts.	 	
	
The rise of New Edition - Roxbury, MA - 1978-1983
	
It's a normal day for the people of Roxbury, Boston Orchard Park, Housing Projects ( "O.P."), in Roxbury, Massachusetts in 1978.

Despite his mother's refusal to grant her son permission, a young Ricky Bell (played as a youth by Caleb McLaughlin) sneaks out at night to meet his friend, Michael Bivins ("Mike") (played as a youth by Dante Hoagland), a basketball crazed street kid, to go to a local talent show, where their mutual friend, Bobby Brown (played as a youth by Tyler Marcel Williams) is scheduled to perform.  Ricky and Mike are impressed by the sound of a vocal group called "The Untouchables", while Bobby's performance is a disappointment as he gets stage fright within the first few seconds of his song.

The next day, Bobby asks Ricky and Mike to join him on stage the next time he performs, thinking that will help him with his stage fright.  Initially unsure, the pair agree as long as another kid from the neighborhood, Ralph Tresvant (played as a youth by Jahi D'Allo Winston), can join. The trio made an assumption of the fact he can be pulled away from a girl, whom he has unsuccessfully been trying to impress with his karate skills, so when Ricky attempts to impress the girl himself, Ralph is able to impress her with his hidden singing talent.

The quartet try to practice at Ricky's house but squabble a fair amount, and are pestered by one of Rickys brothers. Recognizing they need some guidance, Ricky's sister, Peanut (Bre-Z), suggests they meet with Brooke Payne (Wood Harris), a manager for several of Boston's rising musical acts.  The boys sneak into the back alley of a club to convince Brooke to manage them, finally winning him over with an a capella version of The Jackson 5's "I Want You Back".

The next morning, the boys arrive on time to meet Payne. However, Payne doesn't sugarcoat them, warning them they will be doing some extra hard work on their path to becoming musical artists. Payne comes up with the group's name of New Edition, as if they were either a new version or new edition of the Jacksons.

In a format reminiscent of the Amateur Night of the Apollo Theater, New Edition dazzles the crowd with the Jackson 5s The Love You Save. Unfortunately, the judges grant 1st prize to a hip-hop duo, "The Boston Rebels."  The crowd booed the decision, chanting for New Edition so loudly that Maurice gives New Edition a studio recording session and a record deal as well.  To strengthen the Jackson 5 connection, Maurice encourages making the group a quintet, with Brooke suggesting his nephew Ronnie DeVoe (played as a youth by Myles Truitt) as the fifth member. Ronnie's audition is good enough for the group to accept him, completing the initial five-member formation of New Edition.

Squabbling returns at the recording session, with Ricky and Bobby fighting over a pair of headphones, while Ralph was patiently waiting his turn. Instead, Maurice decides to let Ralph sing first. As a result, the performance is so impressive that Ralph is given the lead vocals for "Candy Girl," which would become New Edition's first hit.  Prior to finalizing the group, Maurice visits Ralph and offers him a solo deal instead, but Ralph declines, preferring to remain part of New Edition. With their mothers' oversight, the members of New Edition sign their record contract, receiving upfront payments of $500 each and a Betamax machine. Mike then storms out, feeling upset that this would mean the end of his basketball career dream, but is then persuaded by his mother (played by Yvette Nicole Brown) to carry on. With "Candy Girl" a nationwide hit, New Edition now are rising young stars. The quintet begin taking photo shoots for the cover of their debut album (also named Candy Girl), while also getting ready for a nationwide tour.
 	
First Album and Candy Girl Tour - 1983

With "Candy Girl" #1 on the Billboard charts (topping Michael Jackson), New Edition begins making TV and concert hall appearances, including headlining a show at the Roseland Theater in New York City with Madonna and Kurtis Blow.  When the group has been on tour (with international dates added) for several weeks, the mothers of Ricky and Bobby, who are struggling financially and on food stamps, seem concerned that they have not yet received any checks their sons should have earned from the shows. Therefore, they decide to confront Brooke Payne, who says he is not in control of the group's finances, despite being its manager.  After grumbling about firing Brooke in order to get a manager who could improve the financial situation, they agree to give him a little more time to see if things improve.

Transition of Power / Boys Gone Wild - 1983 to 1984

The tour finally ends (after a performance of "Is This the End" transitioning the kids to young adults), with the teenagers leaving the high life and returning home to the poverty of Roxbury, at least until their tour checks arrive.  However, when the checks finally show up, each member received $1.87 for the entire tour.  Brooke, who had never had a major deal with a music industry label before New Edition and may have made some mistakes due to that inexperience, tries to explain the intricacies of the deal: the label advanced the group money that it needed to record the album and to promote the tour, with the label recouping that advance from the money the boys would have earned from the various tour dates.  An emotional Brooke, who didn't even get $1.87 for all of his work on the tour, insists that he cares about the boys and wouldn't have intentionally made a deal that was bad for the boys.  Four of the mothers vote to fire Brooke as manager. On the other hand, the lone holdout was Flo DeVoe (La La Anthony), Brooke's sister, who threatened to pull Ronnie out of the group. Brooke, however, reminded her that the group was their only best chance at getting out of the projects.

The mothers replace Brooke as manager with Gary Evans (Michael Rapaport), who promises to replace their current deal with Maurice Starr with a better one due to his relationship with MCA Records, impressing the mothers (except Flo). After the boys enter the office singing Popcorn Love, thinking it will impress everyone, Jheryl Busby (Tank), an executive at MCA, privately expresses to Gary a lack of interest with New Edition, whom he views as "some ghetto kids."

Having tasted fame and experiencing typical teenage rebellion, the young men of New Edition are less easy to control. Both Gary and the two security guards/chaperones, Jeff Dyson (Wallace Smith) and Khalil Roundtree, unexpectedly walking in on some of the members having sex with female groupies. There is more tension and a lot of anxiety within the group as well. Ralph (Algee Smith)'s talent and constant professionalism result in him taking the lead vocals on most of the songs for the new album. Feeling slighted, the rest of the group focuses more on women and having fun, often without Ralph, to whom they mockingly refer as "the big star."  This in turn makes Ralph feel betrayed by his friends and frustrated that he is carrying so much of the group's work.

Part Two 
Roller coaster of troubles - 1984-1985

In an effort to patch things up, Ralph asks Gary if the others could have lead vocals in more songs and Gary agrees. It starts with Bobby (Woody McClain) having lead vocals on "Mr. Telephone Man" when New Edition was working with singer-songwriter and producer Ray Parker Jr.  During the recording, Bobby (perhaps letting his constant prominence go to his head) maliciously starts making fun of Mike (Bryshere Y. Gray) for being unable to correctly hold a note. Mike takes this and teasing by the other members personally. He decides to take a cab rather than get in the group's limo, slamming the door shut in frustration. The driver, hearing the slam, assumes that Mike is in the car with them. He backs up and accidentally runs over Mike's foot. When Bobby antagonizes Mike yet again, Mike spits in his face. This eventually triggers a fight that prompted the rest of the group to break up. Gary tells the group that their moms think Mike should be kicked out of the group due to fighting. However, the other guys (including Bobby) stick up for Mike. When Mike returns, Bobby goes up to him first and apologizes for his actions. This allows the group to move forward. While internally repaired, New Edition is clashing with their new choreographer. Jheryl gets upset that Ralph's girlfriend is visiting him during dance rehearsals. A frustrated Gary decides to bring in someone who can help keep the group focused: Brooke, who was back only as the choreographer, not the manager.

Echoing the concerns of MCA executive Jheryl (who, while satisfied financially, is still concerned about the "ghetto boys'" public persona), Gary presses New Edition to maintain a clean image and be (or at least appear to be) single, the latter of which is particularly important to their young, female fanbase. Gary also gets upset about how much money the group is spending, such as a giant castle on the stage. While rehearsing for the "Cool It Now" tour, Bobby gets arrested for two crimes: speeding in someone else's car that doesn't belong to him and driving without a license. When Gary comes to the station to bail Bobby out of jail, Bobby informs him that his girlfriend (who was in the car with him) is pregnant, and he also had money in the car he stole, which was for her. While smoking weed backstage on tour, the group runs into Johnny Gill (Luke James). 
Security guard/chaperone Jeff reveals that Bobby's girlfriend is in labor, and that he's going to be a dad. Bobby goes to the hospital to see his girlfriend and his newborn son, who he names "Landon" due to his girlfriend's water breaking in an airport, and the rest of the group visit him in the hospital to support them. Meanwhile, Ralph's girlfriend back home is also pregnant, but he hasn't told anyone yet. At another stop on New Edition's tour, no one can locate Bobby, until Gary finds him in the car doing cocaine with and receiving fellatio from female groupies. When discussing the situation with his fellow New Edition members, and as Gary rants about Bobby being such a pain to the driver, Bobby insists that he has his personal life under control.

<u>Out with the old, In with the new - 1985-1988</u>

After the tour, the mothers meet with Gary, frustrated yet again at their sons receiving less money than expected. Gary brings up the group's various expenses and drug/alcohol habits as contributing to the smaller checks, despite New Edition's self-titled second album with MCA being certified platinum. The raging mothers kick Gary out of the apartment, and then argue, with Ronnie's mother (played by La La Anthony) saying that they should have stayed with Brooke. In a meeting with MCA executive Jheryl, Gary ask for more money for the group. While on the phone with his mother, Ralph learns that his girlfriend had a miscarriage, partially because Ralph wasn't there to support her during the pregnancy.

Viewing the act as "Bobby Brown with New Edition" instead of just "New Edition," Bobby's ego continues to inflate out of control. It comes to a head at a show in Oakland, California. While enjoying the whole spotlight to himself while singing lead vocals for "Mr. Telephone Man," the remaining four initially felt annoyed over Bobby selfishly trying to hog the entire onstage spotlight to himself, as well as exposing his body and inappropriate dancing. As a result, Ronnie, Ricky, Mike, and Ralph all quickly transitioned into their next song, "Cool It Now." This results in a severely enraged Bobby dictating that he wouldn't perform with New Edition anymore. Since Bobby does not get his way in the group, he tosses his mic in the air before storming off the set, right before returning to the stage to steal the spotlight once again, but Mike retaliates by wrestling him to the floor, causing a complete riot. Fed up with Bobby's actions, Gary pressures Ronnie, Mike, Ricky, and Ralph into voting to kick Bobby out of the group as punishment. Despite their initial reluctance to kick him out due to the facts that Bobby is their friend and he started the group, thinking about Bobby's arrest, severe drug usage, continual selfishness, and disrespect eventually prompts the four to unanimously vote Bobby out instead.

While driving with Jeff (one of the group's security guards that Gary had hired), Mike speculates on what (if any) future the group has without Bobby. Jeff makes a suggestion that Mike should consider getting in the business side of the industry, given how few broke executives there are compared to broke musicians, as well as giving him more control. Mike glances at the All For Love record, which he and the group (including Bobby) had recorded the year prior and notices "Fast Break Productions" on the record rather than MCA Records.  Mike storms into Jheryl's office, interrupting a meeting to demand an explanation. The MCA executive explains to Mike that, rather than being signed to MCA Records, they were signed to Fast Break Productions, which was Gary's company, which in turn had a relationship with MCA Records.  In other words, rather than just being a manager who could use his connections to get the group a deal with MCA (as Gary had indicated to the mothers and the members of the group), Gary had drafted a contract that gave him two things: ownership and control of New Edition. This ensured that he got his money before the group did, as well as allowing him to do things like negotiating a shoe deal without consulting the members of the group. Still stunned that their contract with Gary wasn't much better than their $1.87 contract with Maurice Starr four years ago, Mike can't really respond when Jheryl rhetorically asks him if he even read Gary's contract before signing it as opposed to just relying on Gary's explanation. Jheryl finally ends the meeting with a response, saying, "Welcome to the music business." This gives Mike the opportunity to see what it is like to be a music executive- with the group's approval- meets with an attorney to fire Gary as manager and to work by getting out of their contract in order to sign directly with MCA.

Back home in Boston, Bobby is packaging cocaine for distribution while watching the remaining members of New Edition perform "Count Me Out" on Soul Train. His mom enters his room to tell him that he has a visitor: Jheryl. He feels Bobby has too much talent to waste his life to drugs and offers him a solo deal with MCA, where he eventually records his debut solo album. Having moved in together, Ralph's girlfriend encourages him to similarly go solo. Ralph insists that while he is happy with the group, he does start to record some solo tracks without telling the rest of the group beforehand. When Ralph plays some of the solo songs for Ricky, Mike, and Ronnie, they feel betrayed. They are not very supportive even when Ralph says he would still be part of the group and just do the solo stuff as a side project, which results in Ralph feeling isolated and frustrated.  When Ronnie expresses concern about how he'd take care of his family without New Edition, Mike starts working on a plan, so that they aren't dependent on Ralph. Meanwhile, Ralph, looking forward to solo money rather than splitting with other members of New Edition, shares his feelings with Jheryl. He stresses the importance of two things: timing and positioning, which is why Ralph's solo album will come out later after New Edition records another album. This one with Jimmy Jam and Terry Lewis, who had just produced Janet Jackson's smash album, Control a year prior.

The group arrives in Minneapolis to begin recording Heart Break with Jimmy Jam and Terry Lewis.  Ralph - who is known for always being on time and ready to go - travels separately and arrives late. After a chilly greeting with Ricky, Mike, and Ronnie, Ralph is baffled to see a fifth member of New Edition: Johnny Gill, who Mike and Jheryl thought would be a good fit for the group. Angered that he wasn't even consulted about the decision and upset over having to split money five ways again, Ralph storms off. Johnny, Jimmy Jam, and Terry Lewis are also rattled, as they assumed Ralph knew about Johnny.

Still sulking, Ralph can't help but be impressed by Johnny's voice (if not his cowboy boot fashion sense). After a recording session, the two have a private conversation (because the other three guys didn't bother to hang around for the session), with Ralph apologizing for his initial conduct. He was admitting that the situation was more about his relationship with the other guys than anything Johnny had done. Ralph and Johnny realize they have several things in common, including professionalism and being fed the same story by Jheryl about delaying a solo project until after recording a New Edition album. Ralph also tells Johnny about the solo deal he was offered from Maurice Starr, and how he "turned it down for these fools". Now that Ralph and Johnny were cool, Ralph jokingly asked if wannabe executive Mike sold Johnny on being the next Bobby. Johnny honestly replied that Mike described it as being the next Ralph. Slightly jarred by the thought of being replaced, Ralph regains his normal focus and dedication, with the entire group contributing to a great performance of "Can You Stand The Rain" and work well together recording the rest of the album.  While preparing for Heart Break's album cover photo shoot, the men discuss how they've grown personally and professionally in their years in the recording business. When the photographer encourages them to smile, the group insists they know what works best for them and opts for a more serious facial expression.

While working on a music video for If It Isn't Love (with Brooke Payne once again providing choreography) and preparing for another tour, MCA's A&R/business partner Louis Silas Jr. (Duane Martin) drops the bombshell that Bobby will be touring with them.

 Part Three A Fork in the Road - 1988-1990New Edition continues their preparations for the upcoming tour by releasing their new single "If It Isn't Love." Meanwhile, at the Paramount Pictures studio, Bobby Brown (who has skyrocketed to super-stardom with his second album Don't Be Cruel) prepares for his "Every Little Step" music video.  Brown's barber (DC Young Fly) is distracted by the girls that will appear in the video and accidentally cuts off a chunk of Bobby's hair. This leaves a slant in Bobby's hair that Bobby irately compares to "Gumby." Without time to fix it, Bobby is forced to debut what would become his signature look in the video instead.

Bobby and New Edition are generally able to work well together on the tour, which also features singer Al B. Sure! (Josh David). Despite this, Bobby bristles a bit when "his" supposed lead vocals on Jealous Girl and Mr. Telephone Man will be both sung by Johnny even after Bobby originally offered to sing them himself. After a Washington, D.C. performance (You're Not My Kind of Girl), Mike agrees to listen to a group of young men from Philadelphia sing one of New Edition's songs for him outside the tour bus. Impressed, Mike gives them a business card and encourages the group that will become Boyz II Men to call him.

In 1989, a party to celebrate the success of the tour, revealing how the group split up again. Jheryl is leaving his job at MCA Records to take a major role at Motown and convinces Johnny to come with him and record his self-titled third album - the one Jheryl promised he would support if Johnny recorded Heart Break with New Edition - at Motown. Ralph's similarly promised solo album will be released by MCA but must be re-recorded because Ralph and the executives felt that it would sound too much like Bobby's Don't Be Cruel album. Ralph is annoyed, because his album was originally ready to be released before Heart Break. However, it was delayed in favor of the New Edition album. As for Ricky, Mike, and Ronnie, Jimmy Jam and Terry Lewis suggest the trio start their own group, which would become Bell Biv DeVoe, based on their last names. Finally, the arrogant and disrespectful Bobby, who made a scene by sticking his hands into both of the party's cakes, is angry despite his individual success and being surrounded by attractive women. He almost showed constant jealousy looking out at his former group members.

In March 1990, all six members of New Edition reunite by making an appearance for Video Soul with Sherry Carter. There is clearly awkwardness and tension during the interview, with barbed comments flying all around, particularly between Ralph and Mike (still not yet over inviting Johnny to the group without consulting Ralph), as well as Bobby and everyone else. The show also airs each of the separate acts' music videos: BBD's "Poison", Ralph Tresvant's "Sensitivity", and Johnny Gill's "My, My, My."  When the host asked the most anticipated question, "Would the group ever reunite for a new album?," Ralph suggested there was a possibility to record a reunion album in the coming future.

Are we "Home Again" or not? - 1996-1997

The reunion album is made six years later, in 1996, after the various independent acts somewhat fizzled. This left several in debt, or at least precarious, financial position, especially Ricky (Elijah Kelley).  Several of the group members, now approaching their 30s, are also dealing with personal issues: Ralph is struggling with the passing of his mother, while Bobby is no longer the only member with drug and alcohol issues. Also, Ricky is secretly using cocaine, popping pills, and drinking heavily, hiding his problems from his wife as well as the rest of New Edition.

As the group prepares for a tour of Home Again, Brooke is amazed at their expenses - separate tour buses, large entourages, much luggage - despite their limited success as independent acts, as well as being less professional than when they were kids. While the group will perform New Edition songs, they will also perform the songs of their various respective acts. Unfortunately, this tour does not go well, with Bobby's penchant for missing various interviews and even performances annoying the rest of the group and interfering with scheduled performance times. At one stop, Bobby arrived after the rest of the group had finished performing but decided to close the show solo instead. Bobby claimed that he felt like singing, because the crowd was chanting for him.

The tour arrives in New Mexico, where the miniseries began, though with some additional details on what would lead to the massive brawl. Bobby - on time for a change - decided to sing an extra song, at least partially because Bell Biv DeVoe couldn't go on as Ronnie (Keith Powers) was late. Bobby assumes that he was the real star of the tour. Thus, when Ronnie charged onto the stage to cut off Bobby, Bobby was partially angry, claiming that he was covering for Ronnie by doing an extra song. Storming backstage angry, Bobby tries to blast Bell Biv DeVoe with water from a fire hose but can't get the emergency device to work. Instead, he and his bodyguard march onstage, which brings in the various entourages for a chaotic scene, finally culminating with a gun shot that scatters everyone.

In the chaos, Brooke stumbles away and has a heart attack before being found by one of the members of the Bell Biv DeVoe entourage. An ambulance arrives to take him to the hospital, but won't allow Ronnie (who is Brooke's nephew) in with him. Instead, both Ricky and Mike try to keep Ronnie calm while waiting for a car. Ralph and Johnny get filled in, but Ronnie nearly loses it when Bobby appears to ask what's going on. He angrily blames Bobby for starting the fracas that led to his uncle having a heart attack. Bobby, on the other hand, angrily counter-argues that he would never hurt Brooke and that it was Ronnie who provoked the situation, but Ronnie goes off and tells him that everything that led up to this is his fault, from Bobby acting out ever since the group was just starting, Bobby's severe drug usage, and his continual selfishness, everything he's been doing up to this point which annoyed the rest of the group.

Ronnie angrily storms off for good this time, saying he's done with the tour. Also, he's fed up with Ralph and Johnny always coddling Bobby. Bobby walks off, stating that he was doing everyone else a favor by agreeing to the reunion, but Johnny snaps at Bobby, stating that Bobby did nothing for him. Bobby angrily lashes out at Johnny and declares that New Edition is deceased and finished, and it can stay that way for all he cares. Ralph leaves after getting into it with Mike, and Johnny is fed up wasting his time with the hostility. When a panicked Ricky asks Mike what they are going to do with so many shows left, Mike essentially says the tour and the group are both done.<u>Souls falling apart / Finding myself - 1998-2004</u>In the years after the tour, the New Edition members largely stay out of contact and have their lives go in different directions.

Johnny is largely okay music wise, forming a new group called LSG with Gerald Levert and Keith Sweat but not seeming interested in talking to a radio personality about New Edition and the destruction of the group during the Home Again album and tour during a radio interview.  
Taking all the knowledge of the business side of the music industry that Jeff gave, Mike becomes a full-time music executive himself. He starts his own label Biv 10 Records. Mike is now finding himself on the other side of the table when dealing with artists and often using the same words ("Did you even read your contract?") that people like Jheryl had said to Mike when New Edition was just starting.  
Ralph's short marriage to his longtime girlfriend Xeina ends in a grimey divorce, with her taking the cars, house, sole custody of the kids and half of their shared assets. Being the mild mannered guy that he is, Ralph eventually deciding not to fight too much to contest. 
 With the Home Again tour falling apart and the group not on any speaking terms whatsoever, Ronnie decides to pursue a whole endeavor by enrolling in some real estate classes to become a real estate agent. However, he feels somewhat embarrassed when a fan recognizes him, feeling like he is at a rock bottom. 
The New Edition member really at rock bottom is Ricky, whose drug and alcohol use gets worse when he faces bankruptcy, aggravated by lawsuits from the tour's abrupt end and lack of any job or trade skills other than music. Ricky's wife, Amy, suggests asking the members of New Edition for help but he refused. Instead, he asks her if she knows someone with a truck to help them move out of their foreclosed house. 
Bobby's life at this time, including his relationship with his then wife at the time, Whitney Houston, is not shown in this miniseries but was later shown in his 2018 miniseries, The Bobby Brown Story.

Ricky eventually has an overdose, but his wife finds him in time for help to arrive and save him.  At rehab, Ricky admits that what he was chasing was the feeling of fame, fortune, and popularity that he had years prior, as well as trying to fight the fear that the feeling wouldn't come back.  
In 2004, Ronnie's wedding planning isn't going well, with his latest concern being wasting money for inedible flowers on the wedding cake. His fiancée, Shamari, gets him to admit that his real issue is not having reunited New Edition, either as a musical group or to be his groomsmen for his rapidly approaching wedding.  Concerned that their egos and behavior will both prevent any of them from showing up, Ronnie is convinced to at least invite the other five members to his wedding so that he won't have regrets.I am my Brother's Keeper / BET 25th Celebration - 2005'''

The day of the wedding, Ronnie is in his prep room, on his own, accepting that he's going to be at the altar without any groomsmen. He hears a knock on the door and "Police!", only for it to be Bobby in a dazzling all-white tuxedo. Although Bobby thanks Ronnie for the invitation to be a groomsman, he declines an offer for a drink, saying he has cooled on drugs and alcohol, but asks for a soda instead. After the two make up, the rest of New Edition arrives, including a sober Ricky, Johnny, with Ralph and Mike at least able to be civil to each other. The final arrival is Brooke, back to normal, after his heart attack at the disastrous tour and ready to see his nephew Ronnie get married.

At the reception, Ralph and Mike have a longer conversation, with Mike apologizing for starting the group's break up by bringing in Johnny to replace Ralph. Ralph counters that the group faced bigger problems than that, citing that the problems, which the members were only ready to deal with now that they were older. Rather than just a temporary truce, Ralph and Mike seem to have rekindled their friendship, ready to move forward without dwelling on negative events from the past.

Brooke toasts Ronnie and his new wife and includes New Edition in his toast by reminiscing about raising Ronnie and the other members of the group, encouraging them to be thankful for their success as a musical group and as men.  New Edition reunites to serenade Ronnie's wife with their first hit song "Candy Girl." A BET producer approaches Brooke with the idea of having a New Edition reunion at the channel's 25th anniversary special. Brooke advises him to move quickly, as he doesn't know the next time the group will be together like this. The producer, however, does move quickly enough, as the group agrees to reunite for the BET special.

At the special, New Edition begins to perform a medley of hit singles: "If It Isn't Love," "Can You Stand the Rain," "Candy Girl," and "Cool It Now" before Ronnie introducing Bobby Brown to perform "Mr. Telephone Man" with them. After Bobby gives a solo performance of his solo classic hit single "My Prerogative," Bobby then invites the group along to perform a medley with him. As this goes on, highlights of the miniseries airing are shown as the group sings. They all take a bow and give props and credit to BET for giving their long standing partnership as a final sendoff.

Cast
Main cast

Others

Development
Production
In August 2015, it was announced that BET commissioned the television film that would air as a three night miniseries. Five of the group's members--Ricky Bell, Michael Bivins, Ronnie DeVoe, Johnny Gill and Ralph Tresvant, had signed on as co-producers, while Bobby Brown did not. In addition, the band's longtime manager Brooke Payne had also been tapped as a co-producer and the film was to be written by Abdul Williams who wrote the 2010 film Lottery Ticket. Jesse Collins of the network's Real Husbands of Hollywood would serve as executive producer. Collins later reported that production would air in 2017. In April 2016, it was confirmed that Brown had also signed on as co-producer. It was also announced that ATL director Chris Robinson would direct the film. In November 2016, it was announced that iconic producers Kenneth "Babyface" Edmonds and Jimmy Jam and Terry Lewis had been recruited to oversee the music production.

Casting
Casting for the series began in Boston in January 2016. In April 2016, the network announced that Empire star Bryshere Y. Gray would portray Michael Bivins. The rest of cast included actor and singer Elijah Kelley as Ricky, R&B singer Luke James as Johnny, Algee Smith as Ralph, Keith Powers as Ronnie, and Woody McClain as Bobby Brown. In addition, Dante Hoagland, Caleb McLaughlin, 
Myles Truitt, Jahi Winston, and
Tyler Marcel Williams would portray younger versions of Michael, Ricky, Ronnie, Ralph and Bobby respectively. In May 2016, La La Anthony, Yvette Nicole Brown, Monica Calhoun, Lisa Nicole Carson and Sandi McCree would join the cast as the mothers of the group members: Flo DeVoe, Shirley Bivins, Patricia Tresvant, Mae Bell and Carole Brown. Several others joined the cast later that month including Wood Harris as Brooke Payne, Michael Rapaport as Gary Evans, Wallace Smith as Jeff Dyson, Faizon Love as Maurice Starr, Duane Martin as Louil Silas, singer Tank as Jheryl Busby and actress/rapper Bre-Z as Peanut Bell.

Promotion
The first trailer for the film was unveiled on June 26, 2016, at the 16th annual BET Awards. In July 2016, BET released a photo of the cast recreating the group's iconic album cover for the 1996 release Home Again. In September 2016, BET announced the official premiere date for the film which would air on January 24, 25 and 26, 2017. The network also released an extended trailer which highlighted the legendary onstage brawl between Bobby Brown and Bell Biv DeVoe after Brown went solo. The UrbanWorld Film Festival hosted an exclusive screening of several clips.

Reception
Ratings
The film's premiere was watched by 4.2 million viewers, making it BET's most watched premiere since the 2012 season premiere of the sitcom The Game, which drew 5.2 million. The second and final episodes brought in 3.96 million and 4.23 million viewers respectively, making the miniseries the top rated cable program for three consecutive nights.

CriticalThe New Edition Story has garnered positive reviews from critics. On Metacritic, the series holds a score of 76 out of 100. It currently has a 100% rating, with an average score of 7.2/10 on Rotten Tomatoes, along with the consensus being, "The New Edition Story colorfully showcases its subjects with honesty and clarity while offering an entertainingly paced overview that leaves room for plenty of the group's greatest hits". The film received rave reviews for the child actors who portrayed younger versions of New Edition in the first part of the series. Sylvia Obell of BuzzFeed praised the casting as "absolute perfection" and rated it an A+. Obell compared the film to another iconic television miniseries -- "it is on its way to being the best black TV biopic since The Jacksons: An American Dream" which aired on ABC in 1992. The most talked about similarities is the uncanny "jawdropping" striking resemblance of the young Bobby Brown, portrayed by Tyler Marcel Williams, who nailed the looks, demeanor and Bobby's most iconic "body roll". Also another uncanny resemblance were of the vocals of the young Ralph Tresvant, portrayed by Jahi Di'Allo Winston. For viewers, hearing his first lead solo appearance in the film singing "Candy Girl" gave chills for nailing every note. Trey Mangum of Blavity said that BET "outdid" themselves, saying "With the warm reception and open arms that the world received The New Edition Story with, is clear that this story needed to be told, and this was the perfect time." Mangum complimented the "spot-on" casting of both the young and adult casts, as well as the fact both casts recorded their own vocals, a rarity for musical biopics.

During an interview with Bell Biv DeVoe on the radio show, The Breakfast Club, co-host Angela Yee described the casting for the film as "fantastic." Michael Bivins praised Algee Smith's portrayal of Tresvant and said he was "real nice, sliding into the most difficult spot."   In another interview, Ricky Bell along with Bivins praised Elijah Kelley for his portrayal of Ricky in the film. Bell further praised young actor Caleb McLaughlin for his portrayal as well.

Broadcast
In June 2018, it was announced that The New Edition Story'' will stream on Hulu.

References

External links

2017 television films
American biographical series
African-American television
American biographical films
American television films
Films set in the 1970s
Films set in the 1980s
Films set in the 1990s
Films set in the 2000s
2010s American drama television miniseries
African-American biographical dramas
Biographical films about musicians